Gero Kretschmer and Alexander Satschko were the defending champions, but they did not participate that year.
Radu Albot and Adam Pavlásek won the title, defeating Tomasz Bednarek and Henri Kontinen in the final, 7–5, 2–6, [10–8].

Seeds

  Tomasz Bednarek /  Henri Kontinen (final)
  Andreas Siljeström /  Igor Zelenay (semifinals)
  James Cerretani /  Frank Moser (first round)
  Piotr Gadomski /  Wesley Koolhof (quarterfinals)

Draw

Draw

External links
 Main Draw
 Qualifying Draw

Poznan Open - Doubles
2014 Doubles